Namibia competed at the 2022 Commonwealth Games in Birmingham, England between 28 July and 8 August 2022. It was Namibia's eighth appearance at the Games.

Ananias Shikongo and Christine Mboma were the country's flagbearers during the opening ceremony.

Medalists

Competitors
Namibia will send a delegation of fifty-five (including officials and other staff) to the Games.

The following is the list of number of competitors participating at the Games per sport/discipline.

Notes

Athletics

A squad of twelve athletes and one guide were officially selected on 1 July 2022. The para athletes qualified via the World Para Athletics World Rankings (for performances registered between 31 December 2020 and 25 April 2022).

Men
Track and road events

Field events

Women
Track and road events

Boxing

Two boxers were officially selected on 1 July 2022.

Men

Cycling

Seven cyclists were officially selected on 1 July 2022.

Road
Men

Women

Mountain Biking

Lawn bowls

Two bowlers were officially selected on 1 July 2022.

Swimming

As of 10 June 2022, two swimmers will take part in the competition.

Men

Triathlon

As of 25 June 2022, five triathletes will take part in the competition.

Individual

Mixed relay

Wrestling

Two wrestlers were officially selected on 1 July 2022.

References

External links
Commonwealth Games Namibia Official site

Nations at the 2022 Commonwealth Games
Namibia at the Commonwealth Games
2022 in Namibian sport